Cryptantha nevadensis is a species of wildflower in the borage family known by the common names Nevada catseye and Nevada forget-me-not. This small plant is native to the southwestern United States and northern Mexico where it grows in sandy and rocky soils in varied habitats across the region. Like other cryptanthas it is a very hairy, bristly flowering herb with a curling inflorescence that resembles that of fiddlenecks. This is an annual plant rarely exceeding half a meter in height. It is covered in long, white hairs and its tiny white flowers are about half a centimeter wide. The fruit is a bumpy nutlet.

External links
Jepson Manual Treatment
Photo gallery

nevadensis
Flora of California
Flora of Baja California
Flora of Idaho
Flora of Nevada
Flora of Oregon
Flora of the California desert regions
Flora of the Cascade Range
Flora of the Great Basin
Flora of the Klamath Mountains
Flora of the Sierra Nevada (United States)
Natural history of the California chaparral and woodlands
Natural history of the California Coast Ranges
Natural history of the Central Valley (California)
Natural history of the Channel Islands of California
Natural history of the Colorado Desert
Natural history of the Mojave Desert
Natural history of the Peninsular Ranges
Natural history of the San Francisco Bay Area
Natural history of the Transverse Ranges
Flora without expected TNC conservation status